Golf was contested at the 2006 Asian Games in Doha, Qatar. Men's and women's individual and team events were played at the Doha Golf Club over four rounds from 8 to 11 December. The men played at 7181 yards with a par 72. The Ladies played at 5751 yards with a par 73.

Medalists

Medal table

Participating nations
A total of 93 athletes from 18 nations competed in golf at the 2006 Asian Games:

References

External links

www.jga.or.jp

 
2006 Asian Games events
Asian Games
2006
Golf tournaments in Qatar